Apache Jelly is a Java and XML based scripting and processing engine for turning XML into executable code. Jelly is a component of Apache Commons.

Custom XML languages are commonly created to perform some kind of processing action. Jelly is intended to provide a simple XML based processing engine that can be extended to support various custom actions.

Usage 
CA Project and Portfolio Management, or CA PPM, formerly known as CA Clarity PPM or just Clarity, is a product of Broadcom. CA PPM uses an extended version of the Jelly tag-language as an automation and integration scripting language in its Process Management engine. CA PPM implementation of Jelly is called GEL (Generic Execution Language) and encompasses a new custom tag library that allows easier connection to CA PPM via its XML Open Gateway (XOG). The following example shows how CA PPM implements the classical "Hello World" application.<gel:script xmlns:j="jelly:core" xmlns:gel="jelly:com.niku.union.gel.GELTagLibrary">
  <j:forEach indexVar="i" begin="1" end="3">
    <gel:out>Hello World ${i}!</gel:out>
  </j:forEach>
</gel:script>

Jelly is also used by the ServiceNow platform, which uses Jelly tag-language for scripting the UI, and by the Jenkins continuous integration server, which uses Jelly to allow plugins to extend its UI.

References

External links 
Apache Jelly
Apache Commons Homepage

Java platform
Jelly